CJAN-FM is a Canadian radio station, which airs at 99.3 FM in Val-des-Sources, Quebec. The station, branded as FM 99.3, is a commercial broadcasting radio with local talk and variety music programming.

CJAN originally began broadcasting on the AM dial in 1972, until it moved to its current FM frequency in 2002.

References

External links
 CJAN-FM
 
 

Val-des-Sources
Jan
Jan
Jan
Radio stations established in 1972
1972 establishments in Quebec